"With or Without You" is a 1987 song by U2 from The Joshua Tree.

With or Without You may also refer to:

Film and television
With or Without You (1992 film), a Hong Kong action film by Taylor Wong 
With or Without You (1999 film), a British romance-drama film by Michael Winterbottom
With or Without You (2003 film), an American comedy-drama film by G. Stubbs
With or Without You (TV series), a 2015 Hong Kong drama series

Music
With or Without You (album), a U2 tribute album by Kane
"With or Without You", a 2010 song by Kirsten Price from Brixton to Brooklyn
"With or Without You", a 2000 song by Cher from not.com.mercial